Jenny Offill (born 1968) is an American novelist and editor. Her novel Dept. of Speculation was named one of "The 10 Best Books of 2014" by The New York Times Book Review.

Early life
Jenny Offill is the only child of two private-school English teachers. She spent her childhood years in various American states, including Massachusetts, California, Indiana, and North Carolina, where she attended high school and received a BA degree from the University of North Carolina at Chapel Hill, and later, at Stanford University, was a Stegner Fellow in Fiction. After graduating, she worked a number of odd jobs: waitress, bartender, caterer, cashier, medical transcriber, fact-checker, and ghost-writer.

"I went to UNC-Chapel Hill as an undergraduate and I studied with Doris Betts, Jill McCorkle and Robert Kirkpatrick among others. All three were great mentors to me as a young writer. Later, I got a Stegner Fellowship at Stanford. My big influence there was Gilbert Sorrentino..."—Jenny Offill, to Ellen Birkett Morris

Career

Writing
Offill's first novel, Last Things, was published in 1999 by Farrar, Straus and Giroux and in the UK by Bloomsbury. It was a New York Times Notable book and a finalist for the L.A Times First Book Award. Offill's second novel, Dept. of Speculation, was published in January 2014 and was named one of the 10 Best Books of 2014 by the New York Times Book Review. Dept. of Speculation has been shortlisted for the Folio Prize in the UK, the Pen/Faulkner Award and the L.A. Times Fiction Award. In 2016 Offill was awarded a Guggenheim Fellowship.

Her work has appeared in the Paris Review. She is also the co-editor with Elissa Schappell of two anthologies of essays and the author of several children's books. Offill's short fiction has appeared in Electric Literature and Significant Objects.

"I have always liked compressed and fragmentary forms. I trace it back to my mind being blown by John Berryman when I was nineteen."—Jenny Offill, about Dept. of SpeculationHer third novel, Weather, was shortlisted for the 2020 Women's Prize for Fiction, and in December 2020, Emily Temple of Literary Hub reported that the novel had made 13 lists of the best books of 2020.

Teaching 
Offill has taught in the MFA programs at Brooklyn College, Syracuse University, Columbia University and Queens University of Charlotte. She served as Visiting Writer at Syracuse University and Sarah Lawrence College, and as Writer-in-Residence at Vassar College and Pratt University. She is currently the Writer-in-Residence at Bard College in Annandale-on-Hudson, NY.

Personal life 
In 2008, Offill, 39, a writer and creative writing teacher at Brooklyn College and Columbia University, and her partner, David Hirme, 37, a Web director for Channel 13, a public television station, lived in Brooklyn with their child, Theo, 3.

Offill lives in the Hudson Valley.

Works

Novels 
Last Things. Bloomsbury, 2000.

Children's books

While You Were Napping, Random House Children's Books, 2014.

As co-editor

References

External links

 Official website
 

1968 births
Living people
American women novelists
Novelists from Massachusetts
20th-century American novelists
20th-century American women writers
21st-century American novelists
21st-century American women writers
University of North Carolina at Chapel Hill alumni
Brooklyn College faculty
Columbia University faculty
PEN/Faulkner Award for Fiction winners
Novelists from New York (state)
American women academics